Results from Norwegian football (soccer) from 1938.

Norgesserien 1937/38

District I

District II, Group A

District II, Group B

District III

District IV, Group A

District IV, Group B

District V, Group A

District V, Group B

District VI

District VII

District VIII

Championship rounds

First round
May 22
Odd-Fram Larvik 0-1
Viking-Vigør 3-0

May 26
Mjøndalen-Lyn 1-2

Second round
May 29
Fram Larvik-Odd 1-1 (Total: 2-1)
Vigør-Viking 0-0 (Total: 0-3)
Lyn-Mjøndalen 0-0 (Total: 2-1)

Championship quarter-finals

First leg
June 12
Fredrikstad-Fram Larvik 1-0
Lyn-Gjøvik/Lyn 5-1
Viking-Djerv 6-2
Kristiansund-Neset 2-0

Second leg
June 19
Fram Larvik-Fredrikstad 1-3 (Total:1-4)
Gjøvik/Lyn-Lyn 2-2 (Total:3-7)
Djerv-Viking 4-0 (Total:6-6, Djerv goes to the next round)
Neset-Kristiansund 2-5 (Total: 2-7)

Championship semi-finals
June 26 
Djerv-Lyn 2-3
Fredrikstad-Kristiansund 3-2

Championship final

First leg
July 3
Lyn-Fredrikstad 0-0

Second leg
August 28
Fredrikstad-Lyn 4-0

Promotion
Fjell, Holmestrand, Nordlandet, Sandefjord, Skeid, Skiens-Grane, Skreia, Strømsgodset, Tistedalen, Verdal, Voss, Ålgård

Norwegian Cup

Final

Northern Norwegian Cup

Final

National team

References

 
Seasons in Norwegian football